Jovian (331 – 17 February 364) was Roman emperor from June 363 to February 364. As part of the imperial bodyguard, he accompanied Emperor Julian on his campaign against the Sasanian Empire. Julian was killed in battle, and the exhausted and ill-provisioned army declared Jovian his successor. Unable to cross the Tigris, Jovian extricated his troops from enemy territory by making peace with the Sasanids on humiliating terms. He spent the rest of his eight-month reign traveling back to Constantinople. After his arrival at Edessa, Jovian was petitioned by bishops over doctrinal issues concerning Christianity. He died at Dadastana, never having reached the capital.

Early life and accession
Jovian was born at Singidunum, Moesia Superior (today Belgrade in Serbia), in 331, son of Varronianus, the commander of Constantius II's imperial bodyguards (comes domesticorum). He also joined the guards and in this capacity in 361, escorted Constantius' remains to the Church of the Holy Apostles. Jovian was married to Charito and they had two sons, Varronianus, and another whose name is unknown.

Jovian accompanied the Emperor Julian on the Mesopotamian campaign of the same year against Shapur II, the Sassanid king. At the Battle of Samarra, a small but decisive engagement, Julian was mortally wounded, and died on 26 June 363. Roman soldier and historian, Ammianus, reports that while mortally wounded in his tent, Julian declined to name his preferred successor, fearful that he either might overlook a worthy candidate, or put his desired candidate in danger of power-hungry nobles. The next day, after the aged Saturninius Secundus Salutius, praetorian prefect of the Orient, had declined their offer for Emperor, the army elected, despite Julian's reinstitution of paganism, the Christian Jovian, senior officer of the Scholae, as Emperor.

Rule
On the very morning of his accession, Jovian resumed the retreat begun by Julian. Though harassed by the Sasanids, the army succeeded in reaching the city of Dura on the banks of the Tigris. There the army came to a halt, hoping to cross the Tigris to reach the Empire on the western bank. When the attempt to bridge the river failed, he was forced to sue for a peace treaty on humiliating terms. In exchange for an unhindered retreat to his own territory, he agreed to a thirty-year truce, a withdrawal from the five Roman provinces, Arzamena, Moxoeona, Azbdicena, Rehimena and Corduena, and to allow the Sasanids to occupy the fortresses of Nisibis, Castra Maurorum and Singara. The Romans also surrendered their interests in the Kingdom of Armenia to the Sasanids. The king of Armenia, Arsaces II (Arshak II), was to receive no help from Rome. The treaty was widely seen as a disgrace.

After crossing the Tigris, Jovian sent an embassy to the West to announce his elevation. With the treaty signed, Jovian and his army marched to Nisibis. The populace of Nisibis, devastated by the news their city was to be given to the Sasanids, were given three days to leave.

In September 363 Jovian arrived at Edessa where he issued two edicts. The first, a limitation on the distance a soldier could be sent for straw, was to indicate an end to the war with Sasanid Persia. The second was the restoration of estates of the res privata to the Imperial finances following Julian's incorporating them to pagan temples.

Jovian's arrival at Antioch in October 363, was met with an enraged populace. Faced with offensive graffiti and insulting authorless bills (famosi) throughout the city, he ordered the Library of Antioch to be burned down. Jovian left Antioch in November 363, making his way back to Constantinople.
 
By December 363 Jovian was at Ancyra proclaiming his infant son, Varronianus, consul. While en route from there to Constantinople, Jovian was found dead in his tent at Dadastana, halfway between Ancyra and Nicaea, on 17 February 364. His death, which went uninvestigated, was possibly the result of suffocating on poisonous fumes seeping from the newly painted bedchamber walls by a brazier. Jovian died aged 33 and was buried in the Church of the Holy Apostles in Constantinople, in a porphyry sarcophagus. He was succeeded by two brothers, Valentinian I and Valens, who subsequently divided the empire between them.

Following Jovian's death, Valentinian and Valens removed any threats to their position. Jovian's son Varronianus was blinded to ensure he would never inherit the throne. According to John Chrysostom, Jovian's wife Charito lived in fear the remaining days of her life.

Restoration of Christianity
Jovian was met at Edessa by a group of bishops, including Athanasius, who was newly returned from exile. The Semi-Arian bishops received a poor greeting, while Athanasius delivered a letter to Jovian insisting on the Nicene Creed and the rejection of Arianism. Athanasius was restored to his episcopal duties, and allowed to accompany Jovian to Antioch.

Upon his arrival in the city, Jovian received a letter from the Synod of Antioch, imploring for Meletius' restoration as bishop. By September 363, Jovian restored the labarum ("Chi-Rho") as the army's standard and revoked the edicts of Julian against Christians, but did not close any pagan temples. He issued an edict of toleration, to the effect that his subjects could enjoy full liberty of conscience, but he banned magic and divination. Despite supporting the Nicene doctrines, he passed no edicts against Arians. Philostorgius, an Arian church historian, stated, "The Emperor Jovian restored the churches to their original uses, and set them free from all the vexatious persecutions inflicted on them by the Apostate Julian."

See also

 List of Roman emperors
 List of Byzantine emperors

Notes

References

Sources

Further reading
 
 Banchich, Thomas, "Jovian", De Imperatoribus Romanis.
 Ammianus Marcellinus, xxv. 5–10
 J. P. de la Bleterie, Histoire de Jovien (1740)
 Gibbon, Decline and Fall, chapters xxiv., xxv.
 Gibbon, Edward, 1737–1794. The history of the decline and fall of the Roman Empire. (NY : Knopf, 1993), v. 2, pp. 517–529.
 G. Hoffmann, Julianus der Abtrünnige, 1880
 J. Wordsworth in Smith and Wace's Dictionary of Christian Biography
 H. Schiller, Geschichte der römischen Kaiserzeit, volume ii. (1887)
 A. de Broglie, L'Église et l'empire romain au IVe siècle (4th ed. 1882).

External links

331 births
364 deaths
4th-century Christians
4th-century Roman emperors
4th-century Roman consuls
Burials at the Church of the Holy Apostles
Deaths from carbon monoxide poisoning
Illyrian people
Julian's Persian expedition
Imperial Roman consuls
Romans from Moesia
Illyrian emperors